Barry Hospital is a hospital on Colcot Road in Barry, Vale of Glamorgan, Wales. It is managed by the Cardiff and Vale University Health Board.

History
The hospital has its origins in the accident ward established by the local Nursing Association in a property in Kingsland Crescent in March 1895. A purpose built hospital was opened in Wyndham Street in December 1908. It joined the National Health Service in 1948 and became Barry Community Hospital in 1973.

The current hospital, which replaced the Barry Community Hospital in Wyndham Street, was completed in 1995. The hospital's minor injury unit reopened after a £240,000 upgrade in May 2015.

References

External links 

 
 Healthcare Inspectorate Wales inspection reports

Cardiff and Vale University Health Board
Hospital buildings completed in 1995
Buildings and structures in Barry, Vale of Glamorgan
NHS hospitals in Wales
Hospitals established in 1995
1995 establishments in Wales
Hospitals in the Vale of Glamorgan